Sonwani is a village located in Mohammadabad tehsil of Ghazipur district, Uttar Pradesh. It has total 303 families residing. Sonwani has population of 2168 as per Population Census 2011.

Administration
Sonwani village is administrated by Pradhan who is elected representative of village as per constitution of India and Panchyati Raaj Act.

Notable people
Viveki Rai, Eminent Hindi writer
 Kavindra Nath Rai - sportsperson commonly known as "bhismpitamah'" of varansi basketball...coach of many international and national players..( सैकड़ों अन्तराष्ट्रीय एवं राष्ट्रीय खिलाड़ी देश को प्रदान किये। इनके प्रमुख शिष्यो में मिहिर पांडे (पूर्व कप्तान भारतीय टीम), उपेंद्र सिंह (झन्नू), दिव्या सिंह (पूर्व कप्तान, भारतीय टीम), वैभव सिंह (अंतराष्ट्रीय रेफरी), डॉ शैलेंद्र नारायण सिंह)बिहार और उत्तर प्रदेश के बास्केटबाल खेल के भीष्म पितामह कहे जाने वाले डॉ. केएन राय का निधन मंगलवार को हो गया।@abhi

·
https://www.livehindustan.com/uttar-pradesh/varanasi/story-bhishma-39-s-grandfather-kn-rai-of-basketball-is-no-more-4000247.amp.html
·https://www.livehindustan.com/bihar/gaya/story-bhishma-pitamah-of-basketball-dr-kn-rai-is-no-more-4000294.amp.html

References

External links
Villages in Ghazipur  Uttar Pradesh

Villages in Ghazipur district